Science Museum station, located at the corner of Broad and North Mulberry, is a bus station site of the GRTC Bus Rapid Transit route in Richmond, Virginia, United States.

Station layout

Location 
The Science Museum station is located at Broad Street and North Mulberry Street, in front of the Science Museum of Virginia.

References

External links
 Science Museum station

Buildings and structures in Richmond, Virginia
GRTC Pulse stations
2018 establishments in Virginia
Bus stations in Virginia
Transport infrastructure completed in 2018